Daniel Philip Meuser (born February 10, 1964) is an American businessman, politician, and philanthropist serving as the U.S. representative for Pennsylvania's 9th congressional district since 2019. A Republican, he previously served as the secretary of revenue in the cabinet of Pennsylvania Governor Tom Corbett. He was previously president of the Pride Corporation, a manufacturer of motorized wheelchairs in the Wilkes-Barre/Scranton metro area of Pennsylvania, and currently serves the company as a board member and consultant. He has testified before Congress regarding the criticality for federal practices surrounding rights and caring for the disabled.

Business career 

Meuser was an executive at Pride Mobility Products, a business he built with his brother Scott and his father Stan. His brother, Scott Meuser, is the chairman and CEO of the company. Meuser left the company in August 2008 to pursue a career in public service. He had worked there since 1988. Although he left his position, he remained on the company's board of directors. During Meuser's tenure at Pride, the company grew from $2 million in sales to over $400 million. In 2002, Pride paid $80,000 to settle a government investigation that a Pride customer referral program intended to connect interested consumers with Pride product retailers was not compliant because retailers were required to pay Pride between $10 and $25 per referral as opposed to a flat annual fee.

In 2006, Meuser received HomeCare magazine's HomeCaring Award, which recognized his work in the home medical equipment industry.

U.S. House of Representatives

Elections

2008 

Meuser was a candidate for the GOP nomination in Pennsylvania's 10th congressional district, having announced the launch of his campaign in September 2007. He lost the Republican primary to fellow businessman Chris Hackett, who went on to lose to Democratic incumbent Chris Carney in November 2008. Meuser heavily underscored his conservative values, referencing Ronald Reagan and emphasizing his work at Pride Mobility as part of a larger effort to embrace small-scale government and low taxes. The endorsements he received included many prominent Pennsylvania conservatives, including former U.S. Senator Rick Santorum and then-Hazleton mayor Lou Barletta.

Hackett attacked Meuser for hiring undocumented immigrants at Pride Mobility and funding prominent national Democratic politicians. In 1997, Pride Mobility was fined $41,000 for hiring three undocumented immigrants in 1995; the fine was reduced to $23,000 after Pride Mobility appealed. The individuals in question had presented false documentation to Pride before technology like E-Verify was available. Pride took the incident seriously and took steps to ensure they wouldn't recur.

The discovery that Hackett had previously hired an undocumented immigrant as a maid in his home—though he claimed to have dismissed her once he learned of her status—was perceived to seriously damage his image. On the night of the primary, the very close returns—despite initially displaying a comfortable Meuser lead—soon indicated a virtual tie for much of the night, with little more than 100 votes separating the candidates at one point. But as time passed, Hackett took a lead. By roughly 11:15 p.m. ET, local news media and the Associated Press projected Hackett as the winner, with 52% of the vote to Meuser's 48%.

When Meuser ran for the 10th congressional district in 2008, he lived in the 11th congressional district, where Lou Barletta was running for Congress against incumbent Paul Kanjorski. Meuser promised that he would actually live in the district by the time voters cast their ballots in the primary election; he had purchased a house in Harvey's Lake, which is in the 10th district. He still resides in Dallas, Pennsylvania.

2018 

In October 2017, Meuser announced that he would run as a Republican to represent Pennsylvania's 9th congressional district. The district had previously been the 11th, represented by Lou Barletta, who was running for the United States Senate.

In March 2018, over 100 members of the Lebanon County Republican Committee endorsed Meuser. Meuser "strongly backed" President Donald Trump's "America First agenda".

The Republican primary candidates were Meuser, Scott Uehlinger and George Halcovage. The Democratic candidates were Susan Quick, Denny Wolff and Gary Wegman. The primary election was held on May 15, 2018.

On April 18, 2018, the Making America Great PAC endorsed Meuser. The PAC's chairman said, "Dan is a business-minded problem solver, a conservative, and he is focused on results, not rhetoric. Dan will go to Washington and join President Trump to fight for the America First Agenda."

In early May 2018, the Republican Committee of Columbia County met with all three candidates running for the 9th congressional district seat. After a series of questions about their campaign priorities, the committee voted to support Meuser.

Among Meuser's local endorsements were Shamokin Mayor John Brown and City Councilman Dan McGaw.

Before a debate in Berks County, Meuser told opponent Denny Wolff to "go to hell", which he originally denied before later acknowledging.

In May 2018, Meuser's campaign announced an initiative called "Women for Meuser", a group of women supporters of Meuser for Congress. Meuser was endorsed by at least 31 prominent elected or politically active women, including State Senator Lisa Baker, television host Tiffany Cloud, State Representative Tarah Toohil, State Representative Karen Boback, and Luzerne County District Attorney Stefanie Salavantis.

2020 

Meuser was reelected in 2020 with 66.3% of the vote, defeating Gary Wegman.

Tenure
In December 2020, Meuser joined over 120 Republican members of the House of Representatives in signing an amicus brief in support of a Texas lawsuit that sought to invalidate Pennsylvania's 2020 presidential election votes. The Pennsylvania Attorney General called the case a "seditious abuse of the judicial process". The Supreme Court issued orders on December 11, declining to hear the case on the basis that Texas lacked standing under Article III of the Constitution to challenge the results of an election held by another state.

Committee assignments 
Committee on Education and Labor
Subcommittee on Higher Education and Workforce Investment
Subcommittee on Health, Employment, Labor, and Pensions
Committee on Veterans' Affairs
Subcommittee on Health
Subcommittee on Economic Opportunity
Committee on the Budget

Caucus memberships 
House Aluminum Caucus
Congressional Candy Caucus
Bipartisan Military Depot and Industrial Facilities Caucus
House Small Brewers Caucus
Congressional Fire Services Caucus
Congressional Coal Caucus 
Congressional Chemistry Caucus 
Copper Caucus
Servicewomen & Women Veterans Congressional Caucus
House Paper and Packaging Caucus
Republican Main Street Partnership
Republican Study Committee
Problem Solvers Caucus

Electoral history

2018

2020

2022

Political positions

Abortion
Meuser opposes legalized abortion and has called fetuses "pre-born human persons." According to his campaign, "Dan has personally funded chartered buses to take people from our area to the annual March for Life Rally in Washington, D.C." He opposes federal funding for abortion and federal health coverage that includes abortion services. He also believes that "equal protection must be granted to each born and pre-born human person via the United States Constitution under the 14th Amendment".

Defense and military
Meuser supported Trump's plan to add $54 billion increase in defense spending. He also supported the travel ban on countries that Trump implemented, with his campaign saying, "We cannot allow individuals to enter our country without knowing enough about their identity and background and the need to improve our immigration vetting processes, end visa overstays and examine the issues of chain migration. We can no longer stand by and allow individuals we know little about from countries hell-bent on destroying America enter our country."

Donald Trump

As the House of Representatives was debating HR 489 in July 2019, which passed 240 - 187, condemning Trump for promoting racism and xenophobia after he attacked four Democratic members of Congress, telling them to "go back" to the "places from which they came," Meuser defended Trump and called the bill a baseless attack by Democratic leadership. "I strongly oppose Democrat leadership's latest effort to harass [Trump]. For years, he and his supporters have been subjected to baseless attacks. Such slander is a disservice to our nation and the American people, and I am tired of it." The tweet from which the quote is sourced contained a video in which Meuser, standing on the House floor, said, "I rise today in opposition of House Resolution 489."

In December 2020, Meuser joined over 120 House Republicans in signing an amicus brief in support of a Texas lawsuit that sought to invalidate Pennsylvania's 2020 presidential election votes. Following the storming of the U.S. Capitol building by Trump supporters, Meuser voted to reject the certification of Pennsylvania's 's electoral votes in the 2020 presidential election. He voted against impeaching Trump on an article of impeachment of "incitement of insurrection" in the aftermath of the attack on the Capitol. In May 2021, Meuser voted against the creation of an independent commission to investigate the January 6 attack.

Drugs
Meuser supported Trump's declaration of the opioid epidemic as a national health emergency. He has proposed a three-pronged approach: supply (by increasing the standards by which prescription opioids are prescribed), harm reduction (by having medication drop off programs in communities and by incrementing electronic databases for monitoring opioid prescriptions), and recovery (by coordinating efforts to help non-violent drug offenders become rehabilitated as productive members of society). Meuser voted against the MORE Act, which would have removed cannabis from the federal Controlled Substances Act.

Guns
Meuser supports an individual right to keep, own, use and carry firearms, earning an endorsement from at least one pro-gun Political Action Campaign.

Immigration
Meuser supported Trump's proposal to construct a wall on the entire border with Mexico. He opposes giving federal funds to sanctuary cities. Meuser has argued that President Obama's executive order on Deferred Action for Childhood Arrivals (DACA) was unconstitutional and supports ending DACA. He also supports the government cracking down on employers who knowingly hire illegal immigrants.

LGBT rights
On July 19, 2022, Meuser and 46 other Republican Representatives voted for the Respect for Marriage Act, which would codify the right to same-sex marriage in federal law. Meuser said, "My vote in support of H.R. 8404 was to affirm the current law and support the rights and freedoms of all Americans. The passage of this legislation reflects current law, which was upheld by a Supreme Court ruling nearly 10 years ago. This vote was not difficult for me, as it does not infringe upon anyone’s personal and religious rights." However, Meuser voted against final passage on December 8, 2022.

Taxes
Meuser believes that school property taxes are un-American and unconstitutional, his campaign stating "no tax should have the power to leave you homeless." He has also cited the 14th amendment in arguing that the government has no right to take property away from someone without due process of law or providing equal protections under the law.

Meuser signed the "Taxpayer Protection Pledge" sponsored by Americans for Tax Reform. The pledge commits its signers to "oppose any and all efforts to increase the marginal income tax rates for individuals and/or businesses ... and oppose any net reduction or elimination of deductions and credits, unless matched dollar for dollar by further reducing tax rates".

Texas v. Pennsylvania
In December 2020, Meuser was one of 126 Republican members of the House of Representatives to sign an amicus brief in support of Texas v. Pennsylvania, a lawsuit filed at the United States Supreme Court contesting the results of the 2020 presidential election, in which Joe Biden defeated Trump. The Supreme Court declined to hear the case on the basis that Texas lacked standing under Article III of the Constitution to challenge the results of an election held by another state.

Veterans
Meuser supports the Veterans Choice Act, legislation passed during the Obama administration and extended by Congress during the Trump administration. The policy allows veterans who face long waiting times at VA facilities or live over 40 miles away from the nearest VA clinic to seek care in the private sector, and have the cost of that care covered.

Political career

Pennsylvania Secretary of Revenue 

Meuser was appointed Secretary of Revenue by Governor Tom Corbett after more than two decades in the private sector. The secretary's primary duties include administration and enforcement of state tax laws, effectively operating within reduced budget climate, collections of over 30 state taxes, setting annual state budget projections, developing tax policy for the governor and overseeing the growth and stability of the Pennsylvania Lottery, which generates gross sales of $3.6 billion and net revenue of $1.1 billion annually.

The Council On State Taxation (COST) gave PA an A− rating partly due to legislation that Meuser helped pass and the reforms he put into place. Pennsylvania residents speculated about his appointment by Corbett given that he was one of the largest donors to Corbett's 2009–2010 campaign, making a total of 26 contributions totaling $76,394. There is concern over a recent $103 million computer modernization system for the Pennsylvania Department of Revenue being performed by Accenture, a global technology consultant that the state of Maryland had previously fired by for a similar project due to wasteful spending and missed deadlines.

In 2010, Politics Magazine called Meuser a "Former Congressional candidate and northeast PA money man".

Philanthropy and boards 

Meuser is a board member of the Greater Pittston Chamber of Commerce, sits on the board of trustees for Misericordia University, and is on the board of the Pittston Young Men's Christian Association.

Meuser is a donor to such organizations as United Way, Make-A-Wish Foundation, MS Society, St Jude Hospital, and St. Joseph's Hospital.

Personal 
Meuser is married to Shelley Van Acker Meuser. They have three children. He once claimed a home in Kingston Township as his residence, but changed his registration to a home in Dallas two months before the election. The Kingston home had been drawn into the 8th district after the Pennsylvania Supreme Court threw out Pennsylvania's old congressional map as an unconstitutional gerrymander. According to Meuser, his old home had been drawn just a mile outside the new 9th's borders. Meuser is Roman Catholic.

References

External links
 Congressman Dan Meuser official U.S. House website
Dan Meuser for Congress

|-

21st-century American politicians
American businesspeople
American Roman Catholics
Candidates in the 2008 United States elections
Catholics from Pennsylvania
Cornell University alumni
Living people
Republican Party members of the United States House of Representatives from Pennsylvania
State cabinet secretaries of Pennsylvania
State University of New York Maritime College alumni
1964 births
American gun rights activists